The Communist Party of Australia – Queensland (CPA-Q), also known or referred to as the Queensland Communist Party (QCP) and the Queensland Communist Group, was the Queensland branch of the national Communist Party (CPA). Established approximately at the same time as its parent party, the QCP was one of the party's three largest branches, sitting behind the New South Wales and Victorian branches in electoral results, membership and popularity.

Its main headquarters and support-base was in the South East Queensland region, however the party also maintained strong support in and around Townsville in North Queensland.

Holding numerous Councillors throughout the state, the QCP is the only party branch that held a member of parliament to a state legislature.

Electoral results

State

Notes

References

1920 establishments in Australia
1921 establishments in Australia
1991 disestablishments in Australia
Australian labour movement
Australia
Communist parties in Australia
Defunct communist parties
Defunct political parties in Australia
Far-left politics in Australia
Political parties disestablished in 1991
Political parties established in 1920
Political parties established in 1921
 
Marxist parties in Australia